Joshua Glyn Carson (born 3 June 1993) is a Northern Irish footballer who plays as a midfielder or a winger for NIFL Premiership club Coleraine.

Carson started his career with Ipswich Town's youth system in February 2009, before signing a professional contract in July 2010. He broke into the first team during the 2010–11 season, and was loaned to League Two club York City in March 2013. After being released by Ipswich, Carson joined York permanently in September 2013. He remained with York for three seasons before his release in 2016.

Club career

Ipswich Town
Carson played for Greenisland Boys before joining the Ipswich Town academy in February 2009. He signed a two-year professional contract at Portman Road in July 2010. He made his first-team debut for Ipswich on 19 March 2011 in the home match against Scunthorpe United. Carson scored his first two senior goals on his third senior appearance for Ipswich in a 2–1 victory against Crystal Palace, at Portman Road on 9 April 2011. He added to his tally by netting his third goal within a week, as Ipswich beat Bristol City 1–0.

In February 2012, Carson signed a new two-year contract, with the option of a further year, at Ipswich. He joined League Two club York City on 14 March 2013 on a one-month loan, making his debut in a 2–0 home defeat to Port Vale two days later. Having made five appearances for York. he was ruled out for the remainder of the season with a broken foot, returning to Ipswich at the end of his loan. He was released by Ipswich after his contract was cancelled by mutual consent on 2 September 2013, following trials with Bristol City, Notts County and Hibernian.

York City

Carson signed for York City permanently on 12 September 2013 on a contract until the end of the 2013–14 season. His second debut for the club came two days later as a 63rd minute substitute for Sander Puri in a 2–1 home defeat to Mansfield Town. He scored his first goal for York in a 3–0 win away to Torquay United on 5 October 2013. On 13 February 2014, Carson signed a contract extension until the end of the 2014–15 season. He was released by York when his contract expired at the end of 2015–16.

Linfield
On 3 August 2016, Carson joined NIFL Premiership club Linfield. He made 15 appearances, scoring 2 goals, as Linfield won the 2016–17 NIFL Premiership title.

Coleraine
On 11 May 2017, Carson signed for Linfield's NIFL Premiership rivals Coleraine on a two-year contract. He was a part of the Coleraine team that won the 2018 Irish Cup.

International career
Carson was capped at under-16, under-17, under-18 and under-19 level for Northern Ireland. He played 13 times for the under-21 team from 2010 to 2013. He made his senior international debut on 24 May 2011 in a 5–0 away defeat to the Republic of Ireland.

Personal life
Born in Ballymena, County Antrim, Carson attended Parkhall College in Antrim, County Antrim.

Career statistics

Club

International

Honours
Linfield
NIFL Premiership: 2016–17

Coleraine
Irish Cup: 2017–18
Northern Ireland Football League Cup: 2019–20

Individual
Ipswich Town Young Player of the Year: 2010–11

References

External links

Josh Carson profile at the Coleraine F.C. website

1993 births
Living people
Sportspeople from Ballymena
Association footballers from Northern Ireland
Northern Ireland youth international footballers
Northern Ireland under-21 international footballers
Northern Ireland international footballers
Association football wingers
Ipswich Town F.C. players
York City F.C. players
Linfield F.C. players
Coleraine F.C. players
English Football League players
NIFL Premiership players